Çıralı is a village in the District of Kemer, Antalya Province, Turkey.

References

Villages in Kemer District

tr:Çıralı, Kemer